The following is a list of MTV Asia Awards winners for Favorite Artist Philippines.

MTV Asia Awards